Philipp Graf von und zu Lerchenfeld (25 May 1952 – 1 December 2017) was a German politician for the Christian Social Union in Bavaria (CSU). He was born into the ancient Lerchenfeld noble family, and was a member of the Landtag of Bavaria from 2003 to 2013, and then served as a member of the Bundestag from 2013 to 2017. He was elected to the local council of Köfering in 1990, and the district council of Regensburg in 2002. Outside of politics, he was a farmer, accountant and tax consultant.

Born in Köfering, Lerchenfeld studied agricultural science at the Technical University of Munich from 1973 to 1977. He was a Roman Catholic, and married to Marie Therese.
His wife Marie Therese was born Graefin Ambrózy von Seden und Remete (from a Hungarian comital family).

Lerchenfeld died of lung cancer on 1 December 2017, at the age of 65.

References

External links

  
 Philipp Graf Lerchenfeld at Parliamentwatch 

1952 births
2017 deaths
Counts of Germany
Deaths from lung cancer in Germany
German accountants
German farmers
German Roman Catholics
Members of the Bundestag for Bavaria
Members of the Landtag of Bavaria
People from Regensburg (district)
Technical University of Munich alumni
Members of the Bundestag for the Christian Social Union in Bavaria